This is a list of electricity-generating power stations in New York, sorted by type and name. A more complete list can be found on the NYISO website in the planning data and reference docs section where an annual report call the Load and Capacity Data Report, or the "Gold Book" is listed. The list is located in Table III-2 of the report.

List of resources
The following is a list of existing generation resources contained in the NYISO's 2018 Gold Book grouped by station location.

Other plants
This is a list of plants not mentioned by name in the NYISO Gold Book.

Retired plants
This is a list of retired plants.

References

Network for New Energy Choices. New York, NY. "New York Power Plants" Retrieved 2011-04-16.

External links

U.S. Energy Information Administration - New York Quick Facts

New York
 
Lists of buildings and structures in New York (state)